Bomba the Jungle Boy is a series of American boys' adventure books produced by the  Stratemeyer Syndicate under the pseudonym Roy Rockwood. and published by Cupples and Leon in the first half of the 20th century, in imitation of the successful Tarzan series.

Twenty books are in the series. The first 10 (published from 1926–1930) are set in South America, where Bomba, a white boy who grew up in the jungle, tries to discover his origin. The second set of 10 books (published from 1931–1938) shift the scene to Africa, where a slightly older Bomba has jungle adventures. The first editions all
used the same cover illustration on their dust jackets; only the title would differ from book to book.

A common theme of the Bomba books is that Bomba, because he is white, has a soul that is awake, while his friends, the dark-skinned natives, have souls that are sleeping. Richard A. Lupoff, in his book Master of Adventure, a study of the works of Tarzan creator Edgar Rice Burroughs, describes the Bomba tales as more blatantly racist than the often-criticized Tarzan books.

From 1949 through 1955, Monogram Pictures brought the character to the motion-picture screen in 12 Bomba films, starring Johnny Sheffield. Sheffield was already established as an outdoor star; he had portrayed the character Boy in the Tarzan movies with Johnny Weissmuller. The Bomba films were all set in Africa.

When the Bomba films proved popular with young audiences, the first ten Bomba books were reprinted in the 1950s with all-new cover illustrations by Grosset & Dunlap, a publisher of many popular series books such as the Hardy Boys and Nancy Drew. These same books were reprinted again later by Clover Books, a short-lived publisher that also reprinted the Grosset and Dunlap series Tom Quest. Although the Clover editions had no dust jackets, they retained the Grosset & Dunlap cover art.

In 1962, WGN-TV repackaged the Bomba films as a primetime summertime series called Zim Bomba that became a local ratings sensation. WGN executive Fred Silverman stated that "Zim" meant "Son of" in Swahili.

In 1967–1968, DC Comics published a Bomba comic book series. It ran for seven issues and included scripts by Denny O'Neil and artwork by Jack Sparling.

List of the 20 "Bomba" Novels
All of the first editions had the same picture on the dust jacket; only the title was different. The Grosset and Dunlap books had different cover art on the dust jacket of each title. The Clover editions had no dust jackets, but had picture covers reprinting the Grosset and Dunlap art.

Bomba the Jungle Boy, 1926  (First ten novels were set in South America)
Bomba, the Jungle Boy at the Moving Mountain, 1926
Bomba, the Jungle Boy at the Giant Cataract, 1926
Bomba, the Jungle Boy on Jaguar Island, 1927
Bomba, the Jungle Boy and the Abandoned City, 1927
Bomba, the Jungle Boy on Terror Trail, 1928
Bomba, the Jungle Boy in the Swamp of Death, 1929
Bomba, the Jungle Boy Among the Slaves, 1929
Bomba, the Jungle Boy on the Underground River, 1930
Bomba, the Jungle Boy and the Lost Explorers, 1930
Bomba, the Jungle Boy in a Strange Land, 1931 (Bomba's first adventure in Africa)
Bomba, the Jungle Boy Among the Pygmies, 1931
Bomba, the Jungle Boy and the Cannibals, 1932
Bomba, the Jungle Boy and the Painted Hunters, 1932
Bomba, the Jungle Boy and the River Demons, 1933
Bomba, the Jungle Boy and the Hostile Chieftain, 1934
Bomba, the Jungle Boy Trapped by the Cyclone, 1935
Bomba, the Jungle Boy in the Land of Burning Lava, 1936
Bomba, the Jungle Boy in the Perilous Kingdom, 1937
Bomba, the Jungle Boy in the Steaming Grotto, 1938

Movies

Walter Mirisch had been general manager of Monogram Pictures since 1945. They specialized in low-budget movies, including series of regular characters such as Charlie Chan, Joe Palooka, and the Bowery Boys. Mirisch looked at the success of the Tarzan films and remembered the Bomba novels; he thought they might translate well into movies.

In November 1947, Monogram announced they had bought the rights to all 20 of the novels. They assigned Walter Mirisch to oversee their production, and said they intended to make three Bomba films per year. They were going to be in color. They were seeking a male actor aged 18 to 20 to star.

In September 1948, Monogram's president, Steve Broidy, announced that the studio would make two Bomba films over the following year, and the films would be in black and white.

Mirisch later claimed he was paid $2,500 a film, and the success of the series launched him as a producer. Johnny Sheffield retired at age 24 after completing the twelfth Bomba film, "Lord of the Jungle".

List of the 12 "Bomba" Feature Films
(Note* - Johnny Sheffield plays "Bomba" in all 12 films)
Bomba, the Jungle Boy (1949) starring Onslow Stevens
Bomba on Panther Island (1949)
The Lost Volcano (1950) starring Elena Verdugo
Bomba and the Hidden City (1950)
The Lion Hunters (1951) starring Morris Ankrum and Woody Strode
Elephant Stampede (1952) starring Myron Healy
African Treasure (1952) starring Lyle Talbot
Bomba and the Jungle Girl (1952)
Safari Drums (1953)
The Golden Idol (1954)
Killer Leopard (1954) starring Beverly Garland
Lord of the Jungle (1955)

References

External links
 
 
 
 
Congo Bill
Jungle Jim (serial)
Jungle Jim (film) Titles of feature films
Jungle Jim (TV series)
Ramar of the Jungle

Book series introduced in 1926
Film series introduced in 1949
Series of books
Stratemeyer Syndicate
Juvenile series
Works published under a pseudonym
Novels set in Africa
Novels set in South America
Fictional feral children
Jungle superheroes
Jungle men
American film series